Tutuala, officially Tutuala Administrative Post, is an administrative post in Lautém municipality, East Timor. Its seat or administrative centre is the village and suco of Tutuala.

References

Further reading

External links 

  – information page on Ministry of State Administration site 

Administrative posts of East Timor
Lautém Municipality